Alfonso the Chaste may refer to:
Alfonso II of Asturias (759-842)
Alfonso II of Aragon (1157–1196)